There are at least 16 named lakes and 20 reservoirs in Hill County, Montana.

Lakes
 Amisk Pond, el. 
 Chain of Lakes, el. 
 Dry Lake, el. 
 Dry Lake, el. 
 Grassy Lake, el. 
 Grassy Lake, el. 
 Halfway Lake, el. 
 Hingham Lake, el. 
 Laird Lake, el. 
 Lake Thibadeau, el. 
 Martin Lake, el. 
 Mud Lake, el. 
 Prairie Lake, el. 
 Sage Lake, el. 
 Stink Lake, el. 
 Wild Horse Lake, el.

Reservoirs
 Bailey Reservoir, el. 
 Bailey Reservoir, el. 
 Bearpaw Lake, el. 
 Burkhartsmeyer Reservoir, el. 
 Creedman Reservoir, el. 
 Creedman Reservoir, el. 
 Diversion, el. 
 East Fork Beaver Creek Reservoir, el. 
 Fresno Reservoir, el. 
 Grass Reservoir, el. 
 Grassy Lake, el. 
 Grassy Lake, el. 
 Kiemle Reservoir, el. 
 Lohman Reservoir, el. 
 McKinnsey Reservoir, el. 
 McLean Reservoir, el. 
 Prescott Reservoir, el. 
 Sands Lake, el. 
 Schmidt Reservoir, el. 
 U N Reservoir, el.

See also
 List of lakes in Montana

Notes

Bodies of water of Hill County, Montana
Hill